A list of films produced by the Israeli film industry in 1978.

1978 releases

See also
1978 in Israel

References

External links
 Israeli films of 1978 at the Internet Movie Database

Lists of 1978 films by country or language
Film
1978